This article list ranks buildings in Cambodia that stand at least 150 metres (492 ft) tall, based on standard height measurement.

Most of Cambodia's high-rises are located in Phnom Penh, the commercial and political capital of the country.

Tallest buildings above 100m

Architectural height is considered, so masts and other elements added after completion of building are not considered.

Updated 21 October 2022

List under construction, approved and proposed buildings in Phnom Penh

This lists buildings that are under construction, approved and proposed.

Updated 17 February 2023

List of Sihanoukville completed or topped-out skyscrapers over 100 meters 
This list (last updated March 2020) ranks the tallest completed skyscrapers in Sihanoukville, Cambodia

List of under-construction or proposed buildings in Sihanoukville 

This lists (status April 2019) buildings that are under construction, approved, planned, proposed and Complete. Highrise and Supertall buildings Over 20fl record all in Sihanoukville by Admin Page Phnom Penh Skyline.

Tallest under-construction, approved or proposed buildings in Kampong Cham

This lists (status December 2018) buildings that are under construction, approved, planned, proposed and Complete. Highrise and Supertall buildings Over 20fl record all in Phnom Penh Admin Page Phnom Penh Skyline.

Tallest under-construction, approved or proposed buildings in Kampot

This list (February 2019 status) of buildings that are under construction, approved, planned, proposed and completed. highrise and supertall buildings over 20fl record all in Kampot by Admin Page Phnom Penh Skyscraper.

References

External links
 Official Facebook Page Phnom Penh Skyline

Tallest
Cambodia
Cambodia